Rolf Westphal (born 12 January 1931) is a German former field hockey player. He competed in the men's tournament at the 1964 Summer Olympics.

References

External links
 

1931 births
Possibly living people
German male field hockey players
Olympic field hockey players of the United Team of Germany
Field hockey players at the 1964 Summer Olympics
People from Kahla
Sportspeople from Thuringia